Maddie Mastro (born February 22, 2000) is an American professional snowboarder of Italian descent, specializing in half pipe. She won a bronze medal in the superpipe competition at the 2018 X Games in Aspen.
Mastro was named to the US Team for the 2018 Winter Olympics, placing 12th.

In 2019 she won the Burton US Open Snowboarding Championships, and during that competition, she landed the first double crippler 900 in women's snowboarding competition.

In her second Olympics in the 2022 Beijing Winter Olympics women's halfpipe Mastro placed thirteenth, the second highest American, just missing qualifying for the final round (top twelve qualify).

References

External links

2000 births
American female snowboarders
American people of Italian descent
People from Wrightwood, California
Sportspeople from San Bernardino County, California
Living people
Snowboarders at the 2018 Winter Olympics
Snowboarders at the 2022 Winter Olympics
Olympic snowboarders of the United States
21st-century American women
X Games athletes